Jack Cottrell (April 30, 1938 - September 16, 2022) was a Christian theologian, philosopher and author in the Christian churches and churches of Christ, which are part of the Restoration Movement which also includes the Disciples of Christ and the Churches of Christ. He was a professor of theology at Cincinnati Christian University from 1967 to 2015.  He authored many books on Christian philosophy, doctrine and theology.

Early life and education

Jack Cottrell was born in Stamping Ground, Kentucky.  He married his wife Barbara in 1958 in a traditional ceremony.  Cottrell received a BA from Cincinnati Christian University in 1959 and also a BS from the University of Cincinnati.  He then earned an M.Div. from Westminster Theological Seminary and a Ph.D. from Princeton Theological Seminary in Princeton, NJ. His book "BAPTISM: Zwingli or the Bible" is a "layman's" version of his doctoral thesis.

Cincinnati Christian University 

Cottrell returned to Cincinnati Christian University in 1967 holding a conservative view of the Bible and Christianity.  That continued for 49 years. Dr. Cottrell taught over 40 separate courses, to thousands of students.

Books & Articles 
He has authored 45 books on Christian theology and doctrine - 24 books in just the last 5 years of his life.  Frequent topics include grace, faith, baptism, Biblical accuracy, Biblical consistency, and the nature of God. He has also tackled other issues including leadership and gender roles in Christianity. Many of his books have been translated from English into 15 languages.

His books include:
 Baptism: A Biblical Study
 The Holy Spirit: A Biblical Study
 The Faith Once for All: Bible Doctrine for Today
 Bible Prophecy and End Times
 Set Free! What the Bible Says About Grace
 Power From On High: What the Bible Says About the Holy Spirit
 Tough Questions
 Biblical Answers Parts One and Two
 13 Lessons on Grace and His Truth: Scriptural Truths About Basic Doctrines
 Faith's Fundamentals: Seven Essentials of Christian Belief
 God Most High: What the Bible Says about God the Creator, Ruler, Redeemer
 Solid: The Authority of God's Word
 Studies in First Peter: 35 Lessons for Personal or Group Study
 Saved by Grace: The Essence of Christianity
 The Collected Writings of Jack Cottrell (Volumes 1 - 18)
 The Unity of Truth - Vol. 1
God's Word is Truth - Vol. 2
The God of the Bible - Vol. 3
The Bible Versus Calvinism - Vol. 4
One Baptism Into Christ - Vol. 5
Biblical Anthropology: Man, Sin, and Death - Vol. 6
Jesus:  Lord and Savior – Vol. 7
Spirits:  Holy and Unholy – Vol. 8
God's Amazing Salvation (Vol. 1)  – Vol. 9
God's Amazing Salvation (Vol. 2)  – Vol. 10
The Church of Jesus Christ – Vol. 11
From Now to Eternity – Vol. 12
The Gender Roles Debate – Vol. 13
Living the Sanctified Life – Vol. 14
The Ten Commandments – Vol. 15
Cults and the Occult – Vol. 16
The Reasons for Our Hope – Vol. 17
Studies in Bible Doctrine – Vol. 18 
Studies in Ephesians: 25 Lessons for Personal or Group Study
Studies in Romans - Part 1
Studies in Romans - Part 2
BAPTISM: Zwingli or the Bible

He has also authored several Biblical commentaries. Including:

 Romans NIV Commentary

A prolific writer, Dr. Cottrell wrote numerous articles in a variety of Christian publications. His articles appeared most frequently in The Restoration Herald published monthly by The Christian Restoration Association ("C.R.A.") in Mason, OH. Jack Cottrell served as a Trustee of the C.R.A. from 2003 to 2021. In December 1961, he submitted an opinion piece for The Restoration Herald and then in June of the following year his article "The Use of Scriptural Terminology by Disciples of Christ Leaders" was published in a four-part series. In April 2011, he began penning the "Ask the Professor" column which has appeared monthly ever since. These articles may all be found in the archives of The Restoration Herald.

Theology

Cottrell supports conservative beliefs of inerrancy and infallibility of the Bible and that baptism by immersion is the Biblical method. Cottrell is critical of Calvinism and has mostly supported Arminianism, despite attending theological institutions associated with the Reformed tradition.

Trinity

Dr. Cottrell believes that the "Father, Son and Spirit are distinct persons who exist simultaneously and interact with one another." He rejects a false view of the Trinity called modalism which says that there are no distinctions between God the Father, God the Son, and God the Holy Spirit. Dr. Cottrell calls modalism heretical and a "seriously false doctrine" but believes someone who believes in it can be saved.

Original Sin

Dr. Jack Cottrell denies original sin, at least in the traditional sense. He believes that Romans 5:12-18 actually states that any original sin that might have existed is wiped out by "Original Grace" given to everyone through the death and resurrection of Jesus. Thus, original sin is theoretical only, and never has any real effect on the salvation of believers. When a person sins, they receive partial depravity.  Cottrell would define partial depravity as, "no matter how evil sinners may be, they all have the ability to make a free-will choice to accept the gospel."

Temporality of God

Dr. Cottrell posits that God is temporal, although not bound by time.

Baptism
Cottrell believes that baptism is, "commanded in a salvation situation." Cottrell expands on this thought and states that baptism is required for salvation.  He says, "Repentance and baptism are ...obedience to the gospel, and are works in the same sense that faith is."

Anti-Feminism
Cottrell is the leading opponent in the Christian Churches and Churches of Christ of equality for women.

In the late 1980s, Cottrell became alarmed by the incursion of feminism in the church which he believed was against God's original design for the church. He published his book Feminism and the Bible: An Introduction to Feminism for Christians in 1992. He summarizes the 358 page tome in this blog post, "How Feminism Invaded the Church"., dismissing every version of feminism, including evangelical feminism, as unscriptural.

He sits on the Council on Biblical Manhood and Womanhood. The mission of CBMW is "primarily to help the church defend against the accommodation of secular feminism." (CBMW Mission and Vision Statement) As enumerated in its [Danvers Statement], CBMW is an evangelical organization that seeks to encourage women to the roles assigned to them by the Bible. Moreover, in every walk of life, men are expected to "exercise headship" while women are to "be in submission".(Danvers Statement)

He continued to research the topic and published two more books, Gender Roles and the Bible: Creation, the Fall, and Redemption: A Critique of Feminist Biblical Interpretation (1995), and  Headship, Submission, and the Bible: Gender Roles in the Home (2008).

References

External links 
 Cottrell's personal blog

1938 births
20th-century Protestant theologians
21st-century Protestant theologians
American Christian theologians
Cincinnati Christian University alumni
Living people
People from Scott County, Kentucky
Princeton Theological Seminary alumni
Restoration Movement
Systematic theologians
Westminster Theological Seminary alumni